Cornisepta is a genus of sea snails, marine gastropod mollusks in the family Fissurellidae, the keyhole limpets.

Species
Species within the genus Cornisepta include:
 Cornisepta acuminata (Watson, 1883)
 Cornisepta aninga Simone & Cunha, 2014
 Cornisepta antarctica (Egorova, 1972)
 Cornisepta arrepiata Simone & Cunha, 2014
 Cornisepta crossei (Dautzenberg & H. Fischer, 1896)
 Cornisepta festiva Crozier, 1966 
 Cornisepta fumarium (Hedley, 1911)
 Cornisepta guzmani Araya & Geiger, 2013 
 Cornisepta levinae McLean & Geiger, 1998
 Cornisepta microphyma (Dautzenberg & H. Fischer, 1896)
 Cornisepta monsfuji Chino, 2009
 Cornisepta onychoides (Herbert & Kilburn, 1986)
 Cornisepta pacifica (Cowan, 1969)
 Cornisepta rostrata (Seguenza, 1864)
 Cornisepta soyoae (Habe, 1951)
 Cornisepta uirapa Simone & Cunha, 2014 
 Cornisepta verenae McLean & Geiger, 1998

References

Taxonomical study on the mollusks collected in Marion-Dufresne (MD55) and other expeditions to SE Brazil: the Fissurellidae (Mollusca, Vetigastropoda). Zootaxa 3835(4): 437-468

External links
   McLean J.H. & Geiger D.L. 1998. New genera and species having the Fissurisepta shell form, with a generic level phylogenetic analysis (Gastropoda: Fissurellidae). Contributions in Science, Natural History Museum of Los Angeles County, 475: 1-32

Fissurellidae